Félix Nakamura (June 30, 1940 Lima, Peru - April 3, 2000, Lima, Peru), was a Peruvian animator.

He was born in Peru to Japanese parents, he lived much of his life in Venezuela with his wife Isolina Nakamura and her daughter Rosa Nakamura. He died in his native Peru from cancer, in April 2000.

History
He is known in Venezuela and in some countries of America as one of the most prominent exponents of Traditional Animation in Latin America. He started his career in Argentina as animator, and then settle in Venezuela, brought by the hand of the founder of Bolivar Films.

He was one of the pillars of the founding of the Simon Bolivar University animation studios and its media division Artevisión in Caracas, Venezuela, he served for several years like director of many young animators who began their careers in this animation company. During those years he produce with his team the first soap opera "telenovela" that used animated characters with real people in RCTV, "Dulce Ilusión" was a huge success in the latinoamerican television.

In the 1990s, he prepared the curriculum of studies for the career of animation that was designed at the Andes University in Venezuela. He taught numerous animation courses for beginners, both in Venezuela and in other countries of the Caribbean and Central America. Nakamura in his later years became the center of activity cartoons in Venezuela.

Influences
In several interviews, Nakamura always refers to Max Fleischer and Walt Disney like his most important influence. His favorite movie was Pinocchio, and his preferred character was Betty Boop. Some of these influences can be appreciated in his work.

Work
Nakamura appears in almost all the credits of the animated film material produced in Venezuela between 1985 and 2000. His most memorable work was the animated material used in the Children Museum of Caracas, Venezuela, and the TV commercial of "Pocetas MAS" that after 25 years still on air. "Canción del elegido" is maybe the most remembered material by his public. This video clip was the maximum goal reached by the Simon Bolivar Studios. Other projects like, "Chiribitil" and "Tatacosmico" never were finished because the cost by that period of time. His last great project was "Rosaura en Bicicleta" but never was finished, because his health condition.

In August 2008 was created the First Animation Festival Felix Nakamura, to promote and share animation between Venezuelan artist in the world.

Some of those who are professionally trained by him are: Jesus Quesada, Rosa Nakamura, Manuel Loayza, Maximum Cuya, Benicio Vincent Kou, Pedro Vivas, Miguel Lemman, John Timms and Jorge Zambrano.

References

External links
 Animation Festival Felix Nakamura

1940 births
2000 deaths
Peruvian animators
Peruvian animated film directors